Naubolos is an impact crater on Tethys, one of Saturn's moons. It is named after Naubolus, father of Euryalus in Homer's Odyssey.

References

Impact craters on Saturn's moons
Surface features of Tethys (moon)